The four-spotted barb (Enteromius quadripunctatus) is a species of ray-finned fish in the  family Cyprinidae.

It is found in Pangani River drainage in Kenya and Tanzania.
Its natural habitat is rivers. Its status is insufficiently known.

References

Enteromius
Cyprinid fish of Africa
Freshwater fish of Kenya
Freshwater fish of Tanzania
Fish described in 1896
Taxa named by Georg Johann Pfeffer
Taxonomy articles created by Polbot